The Book may refer to:

Religious texts 
 The Bible, especially a Tyndale House edition of the New Living Translation published as "The Book"
 The Qur’ān (Arabic: القرآن  al-qur'ān, literally "the recitation")
 The second part of The Revelation of Arès, a publication of a 20th-century religious movement founded by Michel Potay

Music albums
 The Book (D-Sisive EP), 2008
 The Book (Yoasobi EP), 2021
 The Book (album), by Root

In fiction 
 The Theory and Practice of Oligarchical Collectivism, a fictional book written by Emmanuel Goldstein that serves as a major plot element in George Orwell's novel Nineteen Eighty-Four
 The Hitchhiker's Guide to the Galaxy (fictional), often referred to simply as "the book" within its namesake series
 The Book (Time Warp Trio), a fictional item from the book Time Warp Trio and television series The Time Warp Trio

Other uses 
 Paul Erdős' concept of "The Book", in which God maintains the most elegant proofs of mathematical theorems and which inspired Proofs from THE BOOK
 The Book (short story), an unfinished, fragmentary short story by H. P. Lovecraft
 The Book: On the Taboo Against Knowing Who You Are, a 1966 work by Alan Watts
 The Book of Tasty and Healthy Food, a Soviet-era government-sponsored cookbook

See also 
 Book (disambiguation)
 The Books, an American music group